Márk is the Hungarian form of Mark (given name), though outside Mark the Evangelist the name is quite rare as a given name in Hungarian. Notable people with the name include:

Márk Rózsavölgyi (1787–1848), Hungarian composer and violinist

Hungarian masculine given names